Thomas Murray Elder, Baron Elder (born 9 May 1950), known as Murray Elder, is a British Labour politician and member of the House of Lords.

Education 
Elder was educated at the Kirkcaldy High School and graduated from the University of Edinburgh with a Master of Arts in economic history. He was a childhood friend of Gordon Brown.

Career 
From 1972 to 1980, Elder worked for the Bank of England. From 1984 to 1992, he was a member of the Scottish Labour Party, and since 1988 its General Secretary. He was also a Labour member of the Executive of the Scottish Constitutional Convention (1989-1992).

After this, Elder became Chief of Staff to the MP John Smith, a post he held until 1994. He was special adviser to Scottish Secretary Donald Dewar at the Scottish Office from 1997 to 1999.

He was created a life peer as Baron Elder, of Kirkcaldy in Fife on 19 July 1999.

He is the third Westminster parliamentarian, after Chris Smith and Alan Haworth, to have climbed all the Munros, the Scottish 3000 ft hills. He completed his round of the 284 peaks with an ascent of Beinn Sgritheall on 9 June 2007, and is no.3897 in the Scottish Mountaineering Club's list of Munroists.

Lord Elder is the Chancellor of Al-Maktoum Institute, a postgraduate research led higher education Institute based in Dundee, Scotland. Elder was investigated over the payments from the Al-Maktoum College of Higher Education and found that he did not register payments in the correct manner. He was also investigated over the misuse of parliamentary envelopes during the dismissal of the former principal of the Al-Maktoum College.

See also
Commission on Scottish Devolution

References

1950 births
Labour Party (UK) life peers 
Living people
People educated at Kirkcaldy High School
Alumni of the University of Edinburgh
Scottish Labour politicians
People from Kirkcaldy
Life peers created by Elizabeth II